Monica Seles was the defending champion and successfully defended her title, by defeating Kimiko Date 6–3, 6–1 in the final. Despite the win, Seles lost the world No. 1 spot to Steffi Graf, as her opponent needed to be in a high ranking in order to Seles to earn bonus points (Date was No. 112 while Gabriela Sabatini, defeated at the semifinals, was No. 3)

Date also became the first Japanese female player on reaching the final of any Tier II tournament.

Seeds
The first eight seeds received a bye to the second round.

Draw

Finals

Top half

Section 1

Section 2

Bottom half

Section 3

Section 4

References

External links
 Official results archive (ITF)
 Official results archive (WTA)

1991 WTA Tour
LA Women's Tennis Championships